RLSY College Aurangabad also known as Ram Lakhan Singh Yadav College Aurangabad is a degree college in Aurangabad district of Bihar, India. It is Constituent College of Magadh University

Degrees and courses 
 Intermediate Of Arts
 Intermediate Of Science
 B.A. 
 B.Sc. 
 Vocational Courses
 code 24002

Campus
 The college is situated on a five-acre plot of land.

References 

 आरएलएसवाई कॉलेज के प्राचार्य का निकाला अर्थी जुलूस
 विद्यार्थियों की उपसि्थति अनिवार्य
 https://aurangabad.bih.nic.in/public-utility/ram-lakhan-singh-yadav-college-2/
 Ram Lakhan Singh Yadav College
 Online Admission Portal

Colleges affiliated to Magadh University
1971 establishments in Bihar
Educational institutions established in 1971
Universities and colleges in Bihar
Bhupendra Narayan Mandal University